Frucht is surname of:

  (1913, Torgau - 1993), German doctor and physiologist
Michael Frucht (1969-), an American neurologist 
 Robert (Roberto) Wertheimer Frucht (1906 - 1997), a German-Chilean mathematician
 Frucht graph
 Frucht's theorem

See also 
 Frucht Quark
 Frücht, a small municipality in the federal state of Rhineland-Palatinate in western Germany

German-language surnames
Jewish surnames
Yiddish-language surnames